Dobieszowice  is a village in the administrative district of Gmina Walce, within Krapkowice County, Opole Voivodeship, in south-western Poland.

In the Upper Silesian Plebiscite on March 20, 1921, 304 votes were given for the village to stay part of Germany, while 85 were given for the village to join Poland.  Accordingly, Dobersdorf stayed part of  Weimar Germany.(see Territorial changes of Poland after World War II).

References

Dobieszowice